Calliobasis miranda is a species of extremely small deep water sea snail, a marine gastropod mollusk in the family Seguenziidae.

Description
The height of the shell attains 2 mm.

Distribution
This marine species occurs off New Zealand.

References

External links
 To Encyclopedia of Life
 To World Register of Marine Species
 Marshall, B.A. 1983: Recent and Tertiary Seguenziidae (Mollusca: Gastropoda) from the New Zealand region. New Zealand Journal of Zoology 10: 235-262

miranda
Gastropods described in 1983